The Grass is Always Greener is a 2006 album by Barbara Morgenstern.

Track listing
"The Grass Is Always Greener" – 4:43
"The Operator" – 4:23
"Polar" – 3:24
"Das Schöne Einheitsbild" – 3:13
"Unser Mann Aus Hollywood" – 2:45
"Juist" – 3:53
"Alles Was Lebt Bewegt Sich" – 3:40
"Ein Paar Sekunden" – 3:34
"Die Japanische Schranke" – 5:06
"Quality Time" – 4:09
"Mailand" – 2:35
"Initials B.M." – 4:09

References

Barbara Morgenstern albums
2006 albums